Farizan may refer to:
 Farizan-e Olya
 Farizan-e Sofla